Psheqo Akhedjaqo (1777–1838) was a Circassian politician, military commander and nobleman who took part in the Russo-Circassian War.

Biography

Early life 
Not much is recorded about Akhedjqo, as Circassians did not write down their history, and all knowledge comes from Russian sources. Reportedly, he was born in 1777 in the Bzhedug region of Circassia. Probably of Bzhedug nobility, he was raised with a martial education.

Participation in the Russo-Circassian War 
Several repots state that Akhedjaqo was a respected person all around Circassia. His arrival made Circassians feel safe and Russian encampments worried. He had a permanent army of at least 6,000 horsemen, and during hostilities his detachment reached 12,000 horsemen. He was famous for his victories over the Russian troops. In addition to military skill, he was also a talented statesman.

Death 
Sources state that he died of an illness in 1838.

References 

People of the Caucasian War
1838 deaths
1777 births
North Caucasian independence activists
Circassian military personnel of the Russo-Circassian War
Circassian nobility